Dollar for the Dead is a 1998 American TNT Western television film. Film directed and written by Gene Quintano and starring  Emilio Estevez. It is the third Western film in which Estevez stars. Film also stars William Forsythe, Joaquim de Almeida, Jonathan Banks, Ed Lauter and Howie Long. Actor Jordi Mollà nominated for Fotogramas de Plata award.

Dollar for the Dead is often perceived as a tribute to the 1960s Spaghetti Westerns, with a liberal dose of modern Hong Kong film-making thrown in. Emilio Estevez portrays a "Man with No Name" role, stylistically akin to Clint Eastwood's 1960s westerns. The film also portrays an atmosphere similar to those of the 1960s, with numerous visual and character references to Sergio Leone's Dollars Trilogy films A Fistful of Dollars, The Good, the Bad and the Ugly, as well as non-Eastwood films such as Once Upon a Time in the West, The Wild Bunch and Butch Cassidy and the Sundance Kid.

Plot
Lone super-quick gunslinger "nameless" Cowboy (Estevez) is on the run from a rancher (Long) and his men, who are out to kill him for killing the rancher's son. A former Confederate soldier (Forsythe) sees how can Cowboy defend himself, even dropping a drink, pulling and shooting a
guy, and catching his drink before it hits the floor. Cowboy gets mixed up with this soldier who has knowledge of hidden gold. So, Cowboy and Dooley, the Soldier tries to complete their map and find the gold because Dooley has only one part of the map. And also Col. Skinner (Redleg commander) on the tale of Dooley.

When Cowboy and Dooley free a man (Lauter) with part of the map to the gold, they then are also pursued by Spanish soldiers. It all leads to a small Mexican town terrorized by soldiers and led a by a good priest (De Almeida) who is another one which has knowledge of the hidden gold.

Cast
 Emilio Estevez as Cowboy
 William Forsythe as Dooley
 Joaquim de Almeida as Friar Ramon
 Jonathan Banks as Colonel Skinner
 Howie Long as Reager
 Ed Lauter as Jacob Colby
 Lance Kinsey as Tracker
 Jordi Mollà as Federale Captain

References

External links
 
 Dave's review of Dollar for the Dead on Amazon

1998 television films
1998 films
American Western (genre) television films
Films directed by Gene Quintano
Films scored by George S. Clinton
Films shot in Almería
Films with screenplays by Gene Quintano
TNT Network original films
1998 Western (genre) films
1990s English-language films